Shirdi (also known as Sainagar) is a city in the Indian state of Maharashtra. It is located in the Rahata taluka of Ahmednagar District.

Shirdi is famously known as the home of the late 19th century saint Shirdi Sai Baba. The Shri Saibaba Sansthan Trust located in Shirdi is one of the richest temple organisations.

Demographics 
As of the 2011 India census, the population of Shirdi stood at 36,004. Males constitute 53% of the population and females 47%. Shirdi has an average literacy rate of 70%, higher than the national average of 59.5%: male literacy is 76%, and female literacy is 62%. In Shirdi, 15% of the population is under six years of age.

Transport

Train 
The Sainagar Shirdi Railway station became operational in March 2009. As of 2011, there are trains from Chennai, Mumbai, Visakhapatnam, Kakinada, Vijayawada, Hyderabad, Mysore and other cities/states that have Shirdi railway station as their terminal stop.

Air 
Shirdi Airport was inaugurated by the President of India, Ramnath Kovind, on 1 October 2017. There are major destinations from Shirdi airport, viz. the airports of Delhi, Hyderabad, Chennai and Mumbai. The airport is located at Kakadi in Kopargaon tahsil area, 14 km south-west of Shirdi. The construction, according to the original plans, was completed in February 2016, and the first trial flight landed on 2 March 2016. There are plans to lengthen the runway from 2,200 metres to 3,200 metres. The target completion date is 2017 or 2018.

The nearest major airports are at Aurangabad and Pune,  and  respectively from Shirdi.

By car 

References

External links 
 

 
Talukas in Maharashtra
Articles containing potentially dated statements from 2001
All articles containing potentially dated statements
Hindu holy cities
Cities and towns in Ahmednagar district
Cities in Maharashtra